John Denis Gray (born 9 October 1953) is an English cricketer, rugby union and professional rugby league footballer who played in the 1970s and 1980s. He played cricket for Warwickshire and Marylebone Cricket Club, as a left-hand bat, and right-arm medium-fast bowler, playing representative rugby union (RU) for England (7s), and at club level for Coventry R.F.C., as a Hooker and representative rugby league (RL) for Great Britain and England, and at club level for Wigan, North Sydney Bears (two spells) and Manly-Warringah Sea Eagles as a round the corner style goal-kicking  or  during the era of contested scrums.

Background
Gray was born in Meriden, Warwickshire, England on 9 October 1953. He was a pupil at Woodlands Comprehensive School, Coventry.

Career
He represented England (RU) in the 1973 International Seven-A-Side Tournament.

Gray won caps for England (RL) while at Wigan in 1975 against France, and Wales, in the 1975 Rugby League World Cup against France, and won caps for Great Britain (RL) while at Wigan in 1974 against France (sub) (2 matches), Australia (2 matches), Australia (sub), and New Zealand (3 matches). Gray was one of the first players to introduce the now routine round-the-corner style of goal kicking to Australia, he won the 1976 Amco Cup 'superstar' prize for player of the competition, he was the 1982 Dally M Award winning , a series of broken forearms, and constant back pain ended his career in 1983.

John Gray was named on the bench in the North Sydney Bears Team of the Century.

See also

List of cricket and rugby league players

References

External links
Cricket Statistics at espncricinfo.com
Rugby Union Statistics at en.espn.co.uk
(archived by web.archive.org) Smethurst stars for Wigan
John Gray

1953 births
Living people
Coventry R.F.C. players
Cricketers from Coventry
England international rugby sevens players
England national rugby league team players
English cricketers
English rugby league players
English rugby union players
Great Britain national rugby league team players
Manly Warringah Sea Eagles players
North Sydney Bears players
People educated at Woodlands Academy, Coventry
People from Warwickshire (before 1974)
People from Warwickshire
Rugby league hookers
Rugby league locks
Rugby league players from the West Midlands
Rugby league props
Rugby league second-rows
Rugby union hookers
Rugby union players from Meriden
Warwickshire cricketers
Wigan Warriors players